The New Eskişehir Atatürk Stadium is a stadium Eskişehir, Turkey. It opened to the public in late 20 November 2016 and has a capacity of 32,500 spectators.  It is the home ground of Eskişehirspor. It replaced the club's former home, Eskişehir Atatürk Stadium.

Matches

Turkish National Team

New Eskişehir Stadium is one of the main home stadiums of the Turkish national Football team

References

Football venues in Turkey
Sport in Eskişehir
Sports venues completed in 2016
2016 establishments in Turkey